Imru' al-Qays II ibn 'Amr was the fifth ruler of the Lakhmid Arabs at al-Hirah, reigning ca. 368–390.

As with most 4th-century Lakhmid rulers, little is known of him, and even the chronology of his reign is approximate. He was called Muhrik ("incendiarist") by his contemporary poets, because  used to mark the faces of rebels with a hot metallic marker.

He was succeeded by his son al-Nu'man I (r. 390–418).

Arab Christians in Mesopotamia
Lakhmid kings
3rd-century monarchs in the Middle East
4th-century Arabs
Vassal rulers of the Sasanian Empire
Arabs from the Sasanian Empire